Bokiddick is a hamlet in Cornwall, England, United Kingdom.

References

External links

Hamlets in Cornwall